The animated television series Totally Spies! follows the adventures of three Beverly Hills teenage girls – Sam, Clover and Alex – who work as secret agents on missions to save the world while keeping their identity a secret from their peers.  Supporting the girls is their employer Jerry from the World Organization of Human Protection (WOOHP). The show has spawned a variety of characters including students from their high school and university, fellow WOOHP agents, and a cast of villains, many of whom have returned in later episodes.

Conception and development 
The show's conception came from the rise of girl band and female singers in the music industry. Wanting to capitalize on the niche, David Michel and Vincent Chalvon-Demersay put their idea into development, which later shifted into production within a year. According to Michel, the series' animation style was intended to incorporate anime influences. The production company, Marathon Media, intended on building on the series brand by forming a three-piece girl band, utilizing German talk show Arabella to create it. Using a panel of judges, 20 demo videos were selected and the winners were selected based on the strength of their performance and the show's viewers. The band was selected and released a single in the spring of 2002, through EMI. According to managing director Dirk Fabarius, "The plan is to eventually create an entire album and establish and promote Totally Spies as a real band."

In an interview with WorldScreen.com, Michel said that prior to his show, there were a lot of boy action-adventure shows and practically nothing for girls, yet in pop culture, there was Britney Spears and Spice Girls. He said that the characters are heavily inspired by the movie Clueless and wanted to mix that with a James Bond format. When they first pitched the show, it had a moderate response, but when the first season was broadcast, the Charlie's Angels film came out, and suddenly the market was full of girl show properties.

The character design was originally done by Gil Formosa.

Main

Sam 
 has long slightly wavy red hair, emerald green eyes and fair skin; she dons a green catsuit on missions. She is described by her Télétoon and film profiles as rational, logical and mature, like a big sister, although she is known to easily become gullible at times, especially when it comes to romance. She thinks up plans and diversions so that the girls can defeat the villains. Although she is fairly serious during her missions, she enjoys hanging out, shopping, and visiting salons. She is not as boy crazy as the other girls, she has fallen for a few in the series, but without much success. One of the running gags is that she is frequently brainwashed. Her last name is not mentioned in her profiles, however, in "Do You Believe in Magic?", where she is undercover as a reporter, she introduces herself as Samantha Simpson. She is voiced by Jennifer Hale in the English version and by Claire Guyot in the French version. In an interview regarding Sam's development in the first three seasons, Hale described Sam as "smart and adventurous, but now you see more of her wacky side and her girly side as well."

Clover 
Clover has short blonde hair, light blue eyes, and medium-toned skin; she dons a red catsuit on missions. Of the three girls, she is the most expressive with the Beverly Hills teenage fashionista attitude, with a strong valspeak dialect, being the first to court the newest available good-looking boy, concerning herself with the latest clothes, diets, and trends, and often competing against Mandy in all sorts of popularity contests. Her Télétoon profile describes her as athletic, agile, strong, and especially impulsive, reacting spontaneously and jumping into action; and ready to teach the bad guys a lesson even if she has no chance of winning. Clover is voiced by Andrea Baker (who was credited as Andrea Taylor for the first two seasons) in the English dub, and by Fily Keita in the French version. In an interview, Baker said Clover has a thing for musicians, likes to get pampered, and is all into fashion. She likes that the girls have fun and kick butt.

Alex 
Alexandra has short black hair, light brown eyes, and dark skin; she dons a yellow catsuit on missions. She is described in the Télétoon profile as the best friend character, affectionate and not afraid to show her feelings. She enjoys sports and athletics but also shares her friends' fashion interests. She is the most naive and absent-minded of the three, sometimes interpreting figures of speech literally, often thinking it was actually going dark just because something is blocking her sight, or picking up and eating foodstuff at crime scenes that is potentially harmful. In the episode "Do You Believe In Magic", it is revealed Alex is the youngest of the three girls (and Clover the oldest). Her driving ability becomes a running gag in some episodes, despite the fact that she keeps getting to take the wheel and proves to be capable of improvising dangerous car stunts. She is sensitive and sometimes gets down on herself. Starting with season 3, Alex reveals interests in Taekwondo, skateboarding, soccer and video games. Alex appears to be racially mixed at first, having a dark-skinned mother and a white father in the season 4 episode "Alex Gets Schooled"; however, her father later appears with a completely different physical appearance, notably with dark skin in the season 6 episode "Evil Ice Skater". In Totally Spies! The Movie, which takes place when the girls first transfer to Beverly Hills High, she adopts a piglet whom she names , who does not appear in seasons 1-5 but recurs in season 6 when the girls have already gone to college. Although Alex says she is allergic to cats in season 1 episode "Wild Style", in "Evil Mascot", she handles Sigmund Smith's stray kitten without any allergic reaction, and she later works in a university cat lab in season 6 episode "Nine Lives" without problems. Like Sam and Clover, her last name has never been revealed but in "Evil Ice Skater," Jerry refers to her father as "Dr. Casoy" but it's unknown if that's Alex's last name or not. 

Alex is voiced by Katie Leigh for the first two seasons and by Katie Griffin in the following seasons for the English dub. In voicing Alex, Griffin used a higher vocal register than usual. She was worried about nodules developing and about being recast when the series returned for season 6 following a hiatus, but was happy when she could return. She found the part to be really fun, easy to play, and liked that Alex was so lovely to animals. Alex is voiced by Céline Mauge in the French dub.

Recurring

Jerry  
The founder and chief administrator of World Organization Of Human Protection (WOOHP, pronounced like "whoop"), as the girls' supervisor. Jerry is a middle-aged British gentleman who briefs the girls on their missions and provides their various gadgets, most of which are in the form of women's accessories such as boots, hairpins, lipsticks, eyelash curlers, hair dryers, and are very mission-specific as if he knew everything beforehand. Some of the accessories are named with convoluted acronyms (such as RASH ("Rocket-powered Amphibious Stealth Hydrofoil"), AWFUL Boots ("All-Weather Fleece Ultra-Light Boots"), or CATS ("Crystalline Airtight Trisect Shield")). He usually summons the girls (or "WOOHPs" them) using trap doors or portals from random items and places (e.g. closet door, trash can, vacuum cleaner), sends them off in similarly over-the-top manners (in roller coasters or even rockets), most of which are practically impossible, or as noted by Sam, "sometimes defy the laws of physics". He also tends to make a lot of bad puns, which the girls sometimes find annoying. During the missions, he looks up information for the girls and analyzes items they send over. His movie profile notes that he cares a lot for the girls and acts like a second father to them. In the episode "Totally Switched", Jerry's last name is revealed to be Lewis. Jerry was voiced by Jess Harnell for first two seasons and then by Adrian Truss for seasons 3–6 in the English dub. In the French version, Jerry has been voiced by Jean-Claude Donda.

Jerry also appears in the spin-off series The Amazing Spiez!.

Mandy 
Mandy is the girls' primary antagonist for their non-spy adventures starting at Beverly Hills High. She has long black hair and violet eyes, with a beauty mark under her left eye. The film website profiles her as the popular girl, charismatic, cute, very rich, and hyper-fashionable. However, she is "the spies' worst nightmare – a pest that does everything to ridicule". She has a high, squeaky voice with a nasal laugh. Her rivalry with Clover is most pronounced, as they often compete over boys, popularity, and bragging rights. Mandy will go out of her way to annoy the girls and will even use dishonest means in order to do it. However, it usually backfires on her more than once and she ends up being humiliated by the girls as result. In the first four seasons, she is accompanied by her crony friends Dominique and Caitlin. In season 3, when the spies move into their villa, Mandy ends up becoming their next-door neighbor. In season 5, she ends up attending college at Malibu University, where she shares a room with her cousin Mindy in the same dorm as the spy girls. In season 6, she employs an intern named Trent.

Despite frequently interacting with Clover and the girls, she is not aware that they are spies. In turn, the girls put up with Mandy's shenanigans and try to protect or rescue her when she is in serious danger from the real villains. Usually when she does discover they are spies, she gets her memory erased following the situation. Jerry makes her a WOOHP spy for the episode "Evil Coffee Shop Much?", and dons a purple uniform. Some episodes have her in a villainous role, such as: "Futureshock!" where she is the top media celebrity in an alternative future and tries to "Mandify" everyone and "Attack of the 50 Ft. Mandy" where she transforms into a giant and captures the other girls. In the multi-episode season finale "Totally Busted", she, Caitlin and Dominique are infected by a chemical called SUDS and become spy hunters or "spy-'ssassins".

In the English dub, Mandy has been voiced by Jennifer Hale, who also voiced Sam. In an interview where she was asked about her impressions of Sam and Mandy, Hale said that she enjoyed voicing such opposite characters: "I love spy/action stuff and it always rocks when I get to be one of those characters.  Plus I get to be a total snot, which is fun too." In the French dub, Mandy is voiced by Céline Mauge, who also voiced Alex.

G.L.A.D.I.S. 

Gadget Lending And Distribution Interactive System (G.L.A.D.I.S.) is Jerry's new personal assistant that is introduced as a main character in season 3 and 4. Michel describes her as a "robot with a SERIOUS attitude". She takes the form of an assembly line with multiple robotic arms that can outfit the girls with the gadgets. Although Jerry created her, she often expresses her own attitude, picking out gadgets on her own and disobeying Jerry's orders. Following her disapproval by the show's fans, G.L.A.D.I.S. was written off the show, where it is mentioned in a season 5 episode that she is sent to a recycling facility. G.L.A.D.I.S. is voiced by Stevie Vallance.

Arnold Jackson 
 is a classmate who regularly shows up in the side stories at Beverly Hills High; he is portrayed as a nerd with glasses who has helped out the girls on the condition that they go on a date with him. In the series opener, he successfully campaigns for Clover to win a popularity contest, and gets to date her for a day, and in "A Spy Is Born" double-episode, he asks Sam out as a secret admirer with the initials "A.J." Despite being turned down "a few, uh, hundred times" by Clover, he is still attracted to her, and works on her publicity campaign in "Super Agent Much?"; he is also a member of Mandy's fan club. He participates in school events including the Halloween costume contest, Most Charitable Teen contest, local raves, student president elections, and the head cheerleader contest, the last of which he beats Mandy and Clover.

Arnold serves as the episodic villain In "Super Nerd Much?", where he acquires a magic ring that allows him to steal the "coolness" from other people. In the episode "Arnold the Great", he is inspired to dress as comic book superhero Admiral Admirable, but it is manipulated by villain Geraldine Husk into thinking the girls are his enemies. His final appearance was in the season 5 opener, "Evil Graduation" where, as class valedictorian, he tells the class off with a "Goodbye and good riddance!"

Blaine 
Blaine is a Mali-U student introduced in the season 5 episode "The Granny" as the captain of the beach volleyball team. He is a freelance assassin whose mission to get Clover to fall in love with him, and then to kill her off. After realizing that Clover is working for the good side, he goes after his boss, revealed to be Geraldine Husk. He later joins WOOHP's Australian branch along with Britney. He appears in the season 5 finale "Totally Dunzo" where he is captured by Mr. X, but when he reunites with Clover, they almost kiss. In the season 6 episode "Baddies on a Blimp", he stows away on the WOOHP blimp to help out the spies when things go awry and the prisoners are released. However, he turns down Clover's affections, saying that he is done with dating LA girls after having dated the "high-maintenance" Mandy. Blaine makes a guest appearance in an episode of The Amazing Spiez! where he is abducted by the spiez' nanny.

Britney 
Britney is introduced in the season 2 episode "Alex Quits" as a new teenage WOOHP spy. She has long dark blue hair, violet eyes, a yellow complexion, and also dons a blue catsuit. She quickly befriends Clover when she says that she is the captain of her high school's cheerleading squad, and Sam when she says she loves playing chess; however, her introduction to WOOHP and her immediate competence and leadership as an agent makes Alex jealous. Following the completion of the mission, Jerry announces that she has completed her training, and deploys her to another branch. She reappears in the season 3 episode "Escape from WOOHP Island" where she is forced on land on a prisoner's island, but is rescued by the girls as they team up again to re-capture the villains. She reveals that she has two agent co-workers, both of whom are good-looking guys.

Following Britney's appearance on "WOOHP Island", producer David Michel noted she would reappear in some special episodes. In the season 5 episode "Virtual Stranger" she gets stuck in a virtual simulation as the result of an accident, causing a cyber demon using her as a host to manifest as three incarcerated villains in the real world. After being freed by the spy girls, she transfers to Mali-U for three more episodes, causing Alex to become jealous of her again. In the episode "Whoopersize-me", The girls and Britney discover that a new exercise trend has been going around campus, and it involves moves taught at WOOHP. Jerry has them track down who's responsible. "Evil Hotel", Britney and Alex become friends again, having common interests such as their favorite movie actor who they are assigned to protect. Britney is assigned to WOOHP Australia and partnered with Blaine, much to Clover's disdain. She returns in the multi-episode finale "Totally Dunzo" as one of the spies captured by Mr. X.
Britney makes a guest appearance in an episode of The Amazing Spiez where she is abducted by the spiez' nanny.

Carmen 
Carmen is Alex's mother. She has a darker skin/eye tone and originally her hair was dark brown but has since appeared the same color as Alex's. Her main goal and focus is for Alex to get a boyfriend. Carmen made an appearance in the Season 2 episode "Mommies Dearest", the Season 4 episode "Alex Gets Schooled", and her final appearance in the Season 4 finale "Totally Busted". During her short duration as a spy, her catsuit is royal blue. At the end of that episode, she becomes an official spy. She looks identical to her daughter Alex.

Voice Actress: Katie Leigh.

David 
David is a classmate who manages to garner the romantic affections of all three of the spy girls (and Mandy). He is introduced in the season 2 episode "It's How You Play The Game". He has many varied interests such as painting and poetry, but also dabbles in extreme sports such as rock climbing and street luge. He is oblivious to the girls' attempts to garner his attention and thinks of them as just friends, or like a sister. In his interviews when producer David Michel was asked if he could share some inside jokes that were put into episodes, he said: "In season II, guess what's the name of the totally hunky, totally clever boy that the 3 girls fall in love with at the same time? David." When asked about why David did not return in the third season, Michel said, "David never was a recurring character. He was present in a few season II episodes so we didn't have to justify his not being in our stories anymore.  But we have realized how important he is to the fans, and decided to have him back in season 4."

Dean 
Dean is a WOOHP agent who first appears in the season 3 multi-episode finale "Evil Promotion Much?" where he and the girls undergo special training to become super spies. He wears a blue uniform. Ever since he was a baby he has demonstrated exceptional agility and was recruited to join WOOHP. Following the first day of the super spy training, he is captured by Terence and used as ransom in order for the girls to eliminate Jerry and steal his microchip. He briefly sides with Terence when the girls return but then reveals he has been siding with WOOHP all along, and that he is the actual training instructor. He then helps the girls rescue Jerry and defeat Terence. He was later shown in "Deja Cruise" where he pretends to be a lifeguard who turns down Clover's advances. He returns in "WOOHP-tastic!" where he is put in charge of the WOOHP gadget lab. In the season 5 finale, he is one of the agents who was abducted by Mr. X.  He also appears in the spin-off series The Amazing Spiez!.

Dominique and Caitlin  
Mandy's two crony friends who accompany her at school and other events. Both have snobby attitudes and high nasal voice inflections like their leader. They were not given names in the first two seasons. According to the profile on Mandy in the feature film, although they support Mandy, the latter is too selfish to care for them. Dominique has dark red hair styled in way similar to Alex's hair, blue eyes, and peach skin. Caitlin has long and curly black hair and light skin. Caitlin was voiced by Katie Griffin and Dominique was voiced by Andrea Baker. They only appeared scarcely in episodes of the first four seasons, and the movie, when the story was set at Beverly Hills High; when the story was shifted to set at Mali-U starting from season 5, they were written off entirely. Their most notable appearance was in the "Totally Busted" arc of season 4, in which they were brainwashed along with Mandy and actively attacked the Spies. In portraying the girls, Baker said that she and Griffin both tried to do their own versions of Mandy.

Gabby 
She is Sam's mother. She wears her orange hair long like Sam's, though slightly curlier. Gabby's hair was originally brown, but it has since appeared the same color as Sam's. Gabby can be overprotective of Sam and only has her best safety in mind. Gabby's first appearance was in the Season 2 episode "Mommies Dearest". She reappears in her second appearance in the Season 4 finale "Totally Busted". During her short duration as a spy, her catsuit is jade-colored. At the end of that episode, she becomes an official spy. She looks identical to her daughter Sam. Sam is Gabby's only child. Gabby made a brief appearance in "The Wedding Crasher".

Mindy 
Mindy is Mandy's cousin who appears in season 5 as a student at Mali-U. She has blonde hair, green eyes, a tan complexion, and speaks in a strong Southern accent, acting very much like a second Mandy, to annoy the girls for the season. She and Mandy room together in the same dorm as the spy girls.

Mrs. Lewis 
Jerry's mother who lives in Devonshire, England. Her first appearance is in the season 2 episode "Mommies Dearest". She gets very annoyed with her son, who tells her that he is a hotel manager. In the season 5 finale "Totally Dunzo!" she becomes evil after a drop of evil DNA falls into her cup of tea. She becomes "Mr. X" and creates robot droids to replace the spies after buying out WOOHP as a way to take over the world. After Jerry manages to reverse the effects, she returns to normal. It is revealed that she was a top spy back in her youth, something Jerry never knew. In the season 6 episode "Totally Switched Again" she becomes a WOOHP spy, donning a lilac catsuit, but retires again at the end of the episode. Mrs. Lewis has also appeared in the spin-off series The Amazing Spiez! when her daughter Sherry has a flashback in "Operation WOOSCI".

Norman 
Norman is Clover's younger cousin. He first appears in the season 2 episode "Zooney World" and is seen again in the Season 6 episode "Danger TV".

Phoebe 
Phoebe is Mandy's mother who also has long dark hair and a snooty nasal-pitched voice. She first appears in the season 3 episode "Forward to the Past" where, in 1975, she wears hippie clothing and had worked on the school news magazine at Beverly Hills High. She has a few appearances later in the season such as the episode "Dental? More Like Mental", she disciplines Mandy for her poor grades by not only grounding her but also withholding her platinum credit card. In the episode "Evil G.L.A.D.I.S Much?" she helps Mandy by buying out the Yves Mont Blanc store.

Plunkett 
 is the spies' fashion design instructor at Malibu University. He is a regular character in season 6, and has high expectations of Clover, especially in the episode "Inferior Designer" where he gives only one A for a midterm runway project. In the season finale, "So Totally Versailles", he leads the class on a field trip to France.

Stella 
Stella is Clover's mother, who looks just like Clover but originally with lighter hair until later with the same hair color tone as her daughter's. She appears in the season 2 episodes "Mommies Dearest", where she is controlled by Tim Scam, and "Zooney World", where she asks Clover to take care of Clover's cousin Norman. In the season 4 finale "Totally Busted", she becomes a spy and her catsuit is hot pink. In the season 6 episode "Nine Lives", it is revealed that she is an earlobe surgeon.

Trent 
Trent is Mandy's intern who debuts as a regular character in season 6. He drives Mandy around in a golf cart, and does errands such as buying her drinks and magazines, carrying her shopping bags, and shading and fanning her in the heat. He wears a dress shirt with a black vest and slacks. He serves as the episodic villain in "Trent Goes Wild" where, during his memory wipe at WOOHP, he accidentally absorbs the DNA of an evil scorpion man. He then becomes a cool dude at Mali-U, and takes revenge against Mandy for the abuse she has laid on him.

Virgil 
Virgil is the supervisor at the coffee shop where Alex, Sam, and Clover take on part-time jobs in season 5. He first appears in "Evil Professor". He appears in several episodes including "The Show Must Go On... Or Else" where he is transformed to become an actor in a western, In "Zero To Hero", he asks out Alex, who considers him just a friend. When the date goes terribly wrong because of his clumsiness and bad luck, he later discovers the girls are spies and uses a serum to bulk up in order to be a superhero, concocting dangerous situations where he can save her.

Oinky 
Oinky is Alex's pet piglet. He wears a blue diamond-studded collar with a gold tag, and even though he is hairless, he has a small spot which resembles a small lock of hair on his forehead. In Totally Spies! The Movie, which takes place when the girls first transfer to Beverly Hills High, he was one of the pets in cages when the giant sushi roll bounced off the cages, breaking them, and setting the animals free. The giant sushi roll, with the three girls log rolling on top of it, chased him to the street, where he got trapped between the traffic and the incoming giant sushi roll, and began to cry for help. Alex saved his life, then adopted him and named him Oinky, and he imprinted on her, licking her right cheek affectionately as a "Thank you". He first joined the girls on their mission at Peppy Wolfman's building, where Alex had Oinky "go hog wild for mommy" as a distraction, and Oinky deliberately ran around the lobby with the other animals and the receptionist in pursuit. Later, Oinky got lost looking for Alex, following her scent to the mall, where he ended up going through the Fabulizor, getting the same makeover as well. Alex quickly realized she forgot Oinky. Later that night, as all of those who went through the Fabulizor get abducted into a strange space station out in space, Alex spotted Oinky behind the crowd and grabbed onto him, with Sam and Clover grabbing onto Alex. During the evacuation, Alex thought Oinky was never going to make it out in time. In fact, she was crying, only to see him run fast to her, finally reunited with Alex. After the mission, Alex and Oinky got invited for a session with Peppy Wolfman. He does not appear in seasons 1-5 but recurs in season 6 when the girls have already gone to college, starting in "Grabbing the Bully by the Horns", when he finally gets reunited with Alex by Jerry, and becomes a new member of the team, as well as their bodyguard at the end of the episode. In "Celebrity Swipe!", Mandy was auditioning for a talent scout, but her performances were foiled by Oinky (by him digging for a truffle under her stage, causing her stage to collapse under her, licking her foot, causing her to laugh uncontrollably, and by jumping onto her radio, fast-forwarding her song, causing her to sing faster), who got picked by the talent scout instead. Oinky hates baths as shown by his fear of water, and he is especially prone to fight-or-flight as shown in "Dog Show Showdown!", where Alex attempted to give him a bath, and she, Sam, and Clover ended up chasing him, but after the Warden deans found out about Oinky, Alex disguised Oinky as a pet dog in order to keep him at Mali-U, and to investigate the kidnappings of the dogs at the world renowned West Hollywood Dog Show. Alex catches Chomper while he went after Oinky. Oinky remembered the bath Alex tried to give him earlier, and he then dove into the water fountains and Chomper went after him and finally malfunctioned due to a short circuit. The girls and Oinky managed to fool the Warden deans into thinking that Oinky was indeed a dog, causing them much confusion. In "Evil Ice Skater", Oinky can be seen bonding with Alex's father, Dr. Casoy, when he gives him a treat. In "Solo Spies!", Alex and Oinky got a new dorm room when Mandy took over the spies' penthouse. Alex and Oinky got abducted by FanGirl, who has decided to take her fanaticism to a whole new level—by accumulating real life spies to add to her collection. Oinky hinted to Alex to use the Eyelash Curler Catapult to escape. The girls and Oinky escaped, and Oinky attacked FanGirl by repeatedly hitting her in the face with his hooves. Jerry, seeing the error of his ways, reunited the girls, and got Mandy kicked out of their penthouse, and made the girls a team again. He and Alex share a strong bond as he sees Alex as his mother, Sam and Clover as his aunts, and Jerry as his uncle. Even though Sam and Clover are reluctant to have Oinky as a roommate, they still consider him a member of the team and a member of their family. Oinky is also fast on his short, little legs, and he is also smart and strong. Alex and Oinky make each other happy, and he is especially protective of Alex and his family. He is known as Groin Groin in the French version.

Recurring villains 
Many villains began making return appearances starting with the second season. In another interview, Michel said that in the third season there is an episode called "Escape from WOOHP Island" in which some of the past villains reappear. Most of them broke out of the WOOHP detention facility, or in the case of Jazz Hands, he was simply released after finishing doing his time. In season 4, Terence rounds up some of the villains to form an organization called League Aiming to Menace and Overthrow Spies (LAMOS), of which their members include Tim Scam, Helga Von Guggen, Myrna Beesbottom and Boogie Gus. In season 6, some villains from earlier seasons, such as the Granny, also returned; one exception was Seth Toyman, who was portrayed as an unwitting perpetrator in season 2, now as a villain with a different backstory and motive.

Boogie Gus 
Boogie Gus is an afro-wearing guy who first appears in the season 3 episode "Forward to the Past" where he uses Jerry's time machine invention to travel back and forth to steal technology from the future and bring it back to his groovy 1970s past where he creates his own WOOHP organization: World Organization Of Harming People. It is revealed that he was actually from the present as a former WOOHP janitor. In season 4, he joins LAMOS where he still sports his 1970s look. In one of the episodes, he uses a ray gun to transform people to a younger version of themselves but dressed in 1980s fashion. In the double-episode "Like, So Totally Not Spies", he accidentally leaks the information regarding Terence's plans and the secret behind the bracelets to the girls.

Boogie Gus has also appeared in the spinoff series The Amazing Spiez!, where his son Gus Jr., has a passion for the decade he was born, the 1990s, which included low-tech electronics and ghetto-based outfits. They try to turn everything back to the way it was in the 1990s but are stopped by the spiez.

Candy Sweet 
Candy is introduced as a coach in the episode "The Black Widows" where her cheerleading squad makes a strong impression in the national competitions. However, it is later revealed that her team is made up of gynoids who have been programmed with the cheerleading routines stolen from the other teams. It is revealed that she was a former student named Margaret Nussbaum who had been rejected by the Honeybees cheerleading team, and has since vowed to have her revenge. In "Sis-KaBOOM-Bah!" she brainwashes teenage cheerleaders nationwide (including Clover and Mandy) with a small training DVD so they can break her out of prison. Candy is voiced by Amanda Anka.

Diminutive Smalls 
Tired of being looked down upon, Smalls invented a shrink ray to shrink others down to his liking, but the machine backfired and shrank him instead. However, he was able to attain incredible strength in the process. In the episode "Shrinking", he uses the ray to shrink major tourist attractions. In the episode "Attack of the 50 Foot Mandy", he tried to seek revenge by enlarging the spies, only to miss and hit Mandy instead.

Dr. Gelee 
Gelee is a scientist who appears in "Ice Man Cometh". Deciding that mankind was too evil and destructive to the planet, he plans to eliminate everyone by freezing the planet while he and his henchmen hole up in his mountain fortress. He chooses Clover to be his ice queen, and forces her to play a game of chess with him, but is foiled by the girls and sent to prison. However, in "Ski Trip", he escapes and follows the girls to a ski resort where he tries to kill them off in a series of accidents. When he kidnaps Clover, he mistakenly grabs Mandy instead because she wears a red snow outfit that resembles Clover's spy suit. Regardless, he uses Mandy as a hostage to capture the girls. He is last seen at the side of the mountain where he tries to fire a laser at the girls, only to have it bounce off and cause an avalanche that buries him, but it is unknown if the avalanche killed him or not.

Geraldine Husk 
Geraldine Husk first appears as the head of a spy agency called Super Protection International (S.P.I.), which during its introduction, becomes extremely successful in capturing criminals, and practically puts WOOHP out of business. However, it is later revealed that she has been using her S.P.I. employees to act as the criminals in fake arrests in order to upstage WOOHP and get her revenge from being rejected from joining WOOHP when she was younger. Geraldine was later foiled by Sam, Clover and Alex, and she swore revenge against them.

In "Super Agent Much?", Geraldine places a serum in Clover's drink which transforms Clover into a "super spy", with enhanced superhuman abilities and powers, while becoming more selfish. She ultimately recruits Clover to join SPI and orders her to kill her friends and destroy WOOHP. However, after being thrown in the lake, Clover's bionic abilities are disabled and Geraldine was again captured. In "Arnold the Great", she tries to ensnare the girls but ends up targeting Arnold instead, giving him some superhero powers. In the season 5 episode "Return Of Geraldine", she is revealed to have hired Blaine to kill Clover, and upon Blaine's failure, changes her goal to make Clover's life miserable. Geraldine is voiced by Kathy Laskey.

Granny 
She is the title character in the episode "The Granny", appearing like a sweet woman in her 80s who likes to bake goodies. In the episode, she is a WOOHP prisoner considered to be very dangerous, but the girls fall for her pleasant personality. She escapes when the girls were trying to transport her to another facility, and reunites with her gang to rob the city's banks but is ultimately foiled by the girls and sent to another prison facility that is more like a retirement resort. In a follow-up episode "Super Sweet Cupcake Company", she bakes cupcakes that make their consumers compliant to her commands. She escapes prison and uses the cupcakes to rob banks without the bank staff aware of any wrongdoing. She would return in two episodes of the Amazing Spiez "Operation Old School", and "Operation Senior Spy".

Captain Hayes 
Captain Hayes is obsessed with celebrities. He first appears in "Evil Airlines Much?" where he captains a luxury airplane that transports celebrities from Los Angeles to Paris, France. However, it is soon revealed that he plans on keeping the airplane in the skies forever. He returns in "Evil Hotel", where he has escaped from prison and creates an underwater luxury hotel with a very exclusive VIP list. Hoping to fill the hotel with celebrities that he has kidnapped, he also devises equipment to raise the sea level of the world's oceans. In the season 6 episode "Celebrity Swipe", instead of trapping celebrities at a location, he abducts them and steals their attributes that made them famous so he can become a celebrity himself.

Helga Von Guggen 
Helga is a fashion designer whom Clover notes as an icon in the industry. In the season 1 episode, "Wild Style", she masterminds the abduction of cruise ship passengers along with her assistant  where she makes a serum that transforms people into animal-like creatures in order to harvest their fur coats. When she clashes with the spy girls, she is infected by her own serum and transforms into a massive Chimaera-like monster, but is defeated and then captured. She returns in the season 2 episode "Fashion Faux Pas" where, having broken out of prison, she hatches a scheme where she creates a fashion line called Mystique whose clothing becomes popular, but in reality it will constrict its users to death when activated. She reappear in the season 4 as a member of LAMOS. In the episode "Evil Jerry", she is arrested, but escapes and returns in the double episode "Like, So Totally Not Spies" where she and the rest of LAMOS conspire against WOOHP by giving out bracelets that make the spy girls forget their spy history. She is voiced by Adrienne Barbeau.

Jazz Hands 
A mime artist who wears an old-fashioned black tuxedo, cape, wine-colored tight pants and top hat. Although he is dressed as a mime, he often speaks, explaining elaborate plans of turning everyone into mime slaves. He despises entertainers such as singers and comedians because they have rendered his practice obsolete and forgotten. His weapon of choice is an accordion outfitted with a cannon that shoots lasers that transform people into voiceless mimes and turns their clothes black and white. In "Mime Your Own Business", he zaps Sam and Alex and attempts to zap folks all over Beverly Hills. In season 5, he has a three-episode story arc where he is released from WOOHP prison and devises a mime-based theme park where he converts visitors into a mime army. He befriends a fellow mime named Miss Spirit Fingers and commissions her to steal a high-tech microchip. However, he later learns that Miss Spirit Fingers is Sam in disguise, and converts her to his cause.  Jazz Hands is voiced by Ben Joseph, who also co-wrote the episode in which Jazz Hands debuted.

Marco Lumière 
The villain of the two-part episode "A Spy Is Born", Lumière is an eccentric Hollywood director who became an outcast from the mainstream film community for his bizarre, often sadistic methods. In revenge, he concocted a scheme where he kidnaps the biggest Hollywood stars and takes them to his private island, filled with various killer robots and death traps. There, the actors would star in Lumière's own personal action movie where all the dangers and deaths would be real. Following his defeat at the island, he is arrested but escapes the WOOHP plane taking him into custody, kidnapping Alex and forcing the girls to participate in his new action film. He is eventually defeated by the girls and Jerry. He returns in the episode "0067", where he escapes prison and uses plastic surgery and the alias "Ocram Ereimul" to impersonate an A-list movie producer to manipulate Jerry into capturing Hollywood's top producers. Marco Lumière is voiced by Dee Baker.

Myrna Beesbottom 
Myrna Beesbottom is a former WOOHP agent who is introduced in the season 3 episode "Space Much?" where she is assigned to be the girls' nanny, which lasts for the duration of that episode. She wears a maid uniform and is very strict on the girls. She reappears as a villain in the episode "Evil Valentine's Day" where she puts a ring on Jerry's finger that causes him to fall in love with her. Jerry and Myrna marry, however, it is revealed that she did so in order to take over WOOHP headquarters.  In the season 4 opener episode "The Dream Teens", she joins LAMOS and develops plasma androids who act as the spies' boyfriends with the purpose of draining the girls' energy. Despite her large build, Myrna is very agile and strong, with familiarity in ninja martial arts and weapons.

Sebastian Saga 
Sebastian Saga is the first villain to appear in the series. He is introduced as the manager for fledgling rock star Ricky Mathis. A former guitar player, he was severely injured in a pyrotechnics accident that destroyed his career and left him with a metal prosthetic glove for his missing left hand. In addition, he had to style his hair so as to conceal the left side of his face. In the series' first episode "A Thing for Musicians", he uses hypnotic music in the form of glowing microdisc CDs during Mathis's performances to control the crowd and to incite them into attacking the world's governments. However, the spy girls foil his plans when they redirected the disc's brainwashing powers to him, rendering him catatonic long enough for him to be found and imprisoned. He returns in "Stark Raving Mad" where he has escaped from prison (apparently, his escape wasn't noticed) and acts as a DJ at the local raves where he turns the girls' peers into angry rioters to trash the girls' favorite places such as the skating rink, the art museum, the Beverly Hills mall, and ultimately their high school. Sebastian is voiced by Jim Ward. He would later return in The Amazing Spiez episode, "Operation: Tami Trouble".

Terence 
Terence is Jerry's evil twin brother and the primary arch-nemesis starting in the multiple-episode season 3 finale, "Evil Promotion Much?". In that episode, he facilitates the training for the girls so that they can become super spies. At first, Terence appeared to be an easy-going, relaxed administrator, but soon turns against them. His underlying motive is that he was betrayed by his brother when they were copying each other's answers during an exam. He then had his face and voice surgically altered. In season 4, he creates an organization called League Aiming to Menace and Overthrow Spies (L.A.M.O.S.), made up of WOOHP villains from previous episodes. During their first meeting, he discovers the silliness of the acronym, but as he had already purchased merchandise with the brand, he keeps it as is. He wears a white curly wig and runs the group from a leaky submarine where they serve as recurring villains for several episodes. He also makes an appearance in episode "Scary Jerry" on the spinoff show The Amazing Spiez!.

Tim Scam 
A psychotic, narcissistic, and sociopathic mastermind with destructive plans for the world and WOOHP. He first appears in "The New Jerry" episode, where he kidnaps Jerry and replaces him at WOOHP, going under the alias "Mac Smit", and giving the girls an assignment but sabotaging their vehicles. He is later revealed to be a former WOOHP weapons technician who developed a heat-ray capable of evaporating the Earth's oceans; he ultimately got fired for illegal use of WOOHP weapons and seeks revenge on the organization. In "Mommies Dearest" he escaped from jail and attempted to get revenge on the girls by mind-controlling their mothers and using them to kill the girls. In "Morphing is so 1987" Tim attempts to destroy WOOHP using T-1000 robots capable of mimicking the appearance of others. He reappears in season 4 as a member of LAMOS.

Violet Vanderfleet 
Violet Vanderfleet is a botanist who appears in "Evil Bouquets Are So Passe". She develops a hybrid of poisonous plants that are able to move on their own and knock out their targets with sleeping gas. In the episode, she delivers the plants to all the guys who have dumped her, and plans to use the flowers to destroy all of the men in the world and to stand up for all the heartbroken girls. She is eventually stopped when one of the plants catches a strand of her hair and attacks her, putting her to sleep until WOOHP arrests her and undoes the effects with an antidote. She returns in the episode "Baddies on a Blimp" where she, Manny Wong and Yves Mont Blanc are accidentally released and take over the WOOHP blimp.

Willard 
Willard is a scientist first appearing in the season 2 episode "Alex Quits". He despises anything that moves too quickly, recalling remarks from his past such as not getting a raise because of working too slow, or not making the track team because of running too slow. After years of failed cloning research, he develops a ray gun that slows down the molecules of its targets, putting them in a state of slow motion. In the season 3 episode "Escape from WOOHP Island", he orchestrates an escape attempt of WOOHP prisoners by employing a different ray gun to bring down Britney's plane, and then disguises himself as her in order to kill the spies and take their plane. However, the spies unmask him, forcing him to attack directly. Although he dislikes speed, his martial arts technique is quick, although not as fast as Britney's. Following "WOOHP Island", he has appeared as a background character in episodes involving WOOHP prisoners. Willard has been voiced by Dee Baker.

Yves Mont Blanc 
Yves Mont Blanc is a shoe designer who has been referenced in multiple episodes and as Clover's favorite shoe designer. In "Evil Shoe Designer", he abducts fashion critics who have responded negatively to his latest designs and forces them to wear boots that comply with his commands. He also appears in the episode "Baddies on a Blimp" where helps take over the WOOHP blimp.

Notes

Works cited 
 Totally Spies! episodes

References 

Totally Spies!
Totally Spies
Totally Spies